Iran competed at the 2016 Asian Beach Games held in Danang, Vietnam from 24 September to 3 October 2016. Iran finished 4th in medal table with 21 medals including nine gold medals.

Competitors

Medal summary

Medal table

Medalists

Results by event

Beach athletics

Men

Beach kurash

Men

Beach sambo

Men

Beach wrestling

Men

Ju-jitsu

Men's ne-waza

Muaythai

Men

Pencak silat

Men's tanding

Vocotruyen

Men

Vovinam

Men's performance

References

External links 
 

2016 in Iranian sport
Nations at the 2016 Asian Beach Games
2016